This list of mammals of India comprises all the mammal species alive in India today. Some of them are common to the point of being considered vermin while others are exceedingly rare. Many species are known from just a few zoological specimens in museums collected in the 19th and 20th centuries. Many of the carnivores and larger mammals are restricted in their distribution to forests in protected areas, while others live within cities in the close proximity of humans. They range in size from the Eurasian pygmy shrew (Sorex minutus) to the Asian elephant (Elephas maximus). They include nocturnal small mammals endemic to India such as the Malabar large-spotted civet (Viverra civettina). While the status of many of these species is unknown, some are definitely extinct. Populations of many carnivores are threatened. The tiger (Panthera tigris), dhole (Cuon alpinus), and Malabar large-spotted civet (Viverra civettina) are some of the most endangered carnivore species. Two rhinoceros species are extinct within the Indian region, but the remaining species, the Indian rhinoceros (Rhinoceros unicornis) has its last stronghold within India.

Order: Insectivora

Family Erinaceidae: hedgehogs
 Indian long-eared hedgehog (Hemiechinus collaris) 
 Brandt's hedgehog (Hemiechinus hypomelas) 
 Indian hedgehog (Paraechinus micropus) 
 Madras hedgehog (Paraechinus nudiventris)  endemic

Family Talpidae: moles 
 White-tailed mole (Parascaptor leucura) 
 Himalayan mole (Euroscaptor micrura)

Family Soricidae: shrews

Soricinae
 Chinese mole shrew (Anourosorex squamipes) 
 Himalayan water shrew (Chimarrogale himalayica) 
 Elegant water shrew (Nectogale elegans) 
 Eurasian pygmy shrew (Sorex minutus) 
 Kashmir pygmy shrew (Sorex planiceps) 
 Hodgson's brown-toothed shrew (Soriculus caudatus) 
 Long-tailed brown-toothed shrew (Soriculus leucops) 
 Long-tailed mountain shrew (Soriculus macrurus) 
 Himalayan shrew (Soriculus nigrescens)

Crocidurinae
 Andaman shrew (Crocidura andamanensis) 
 Asian grey shrew (Crocidura attenuata) 
 Southeast Asian shrew (Crocidura fuliginosa) 
 Andaman spiny shrew (Crocidura hispida) 
 Horsfield's shrew (Crocidura horsfieldii) 
 Jenkins's shrew (Crocidura jenkinsi) 
 Bicolored shrew (Crocidura leucodon) 
 Nicobar shrew (Crocidura nicobarica) 
 Pale grey shrew (Crocidura pergrisea) 
 Kashmir white-toothed shrew (Crocidura pullata) 
 Sonnerat's shrew (Diplomesodon sonnerati) 
 Kelaart's long-clawed shrew (Feroculus feroculus) 
 Day's shrew (Suncus dayi)  (endemic)
 Etruscan shrew (Suncus etruscus) 
 Asian house shrew (Suncus murinus) 
 Anderson's shrew (Suncus stoliczkanus)

Order: Scandentia

Family Tupaiidae: treeshrews

Tupaiinae
 Madras treeshrew (Anathana ellioti) 
 Northern treeshrew (Tupaia belangeri) 
 Tupaia nicobarica (Tupaia nicobarica)

Order: Chiroptera: bats

Family Pteropodidae: fruit bats 
 Lesser short-nosed fruit bat (Cynopterus brachyotis) 
 Greater short-nosed fruit bat (Cynopterus sphinx) 
 Lesser dawn bat (Eonycteris spelaea) 
 Cave nectar bat (Latidens salimalii) 
 Long-tongued fruit bat (Macroglossus sobrinus) 
 Ratanaworabhan's fruit bat (Megaerops niphanae) 
 Nicobar flying fox (Pteropus faunulus) 
 Indian flying fox (Pteropus giganteus)  
 Small flying fox (Pteropus hypomelanus) 
 Black-eared flying fox (Pteropus melanotus) 
 Large flying fox (Pteropus vampyrus) 
 Leschenault's rousette (Rousettus leschenaulti) 
 Blanford's fruit bat (Sphaerias blanfordi)

Family Rhinopomatidae: mouse-tailed bats 
 Lesser mouse-tailed bat (Rhinopoma hardwickii) 
 Greater mouse-tailed bat (Rhinopoma microphyllum)

Family Emballonuridae: sheath-tailed bats 
 Long-winged tomb bat (Taphozous longimanus) 
 Black-bearded tomb bat (Taphozous melanopogon) 
 Naked-rumped tomb bat (Taphozous nudiventris) 
 Egyptian tomb bat (Taphozous perforatus) 
 Taphozous saccolaimus 
 Theobald's tomb bat (Taphozous theobaldi)

Family Megadermatidae: false vampire bats 
 Greater false vampire bat (Megaderma lyra) 
 Lesser false vampire bat (Megaderma spasma)

Family Rhinolophidae: horseshoe bats 
 Intermediate horseshoe bat (Rhinolophus affinis) 
 Andaman horseshoe bat (Rhinolophus cognatus) 
 Greater horseshoe bat (Rhinolophus ferrumequinum) 
 Lesser horseshoe bat (Rhinolophus hipposideros) 
 Blyth's horseshoe bat (Rhinolophus lepidus) 
 Woolly horseshoe bat (Rhinolophus luctus) 
 Mitred horseshoe bat (Rhinolophus mitratus)  endemic to Bihar
 Pearson's horseshoe bat (Rhinolophus pearsonii) 
 Least horseshoe bat (Rhinolophus pusillus ) 
 Rufous horseshoe bat (Rhinolophus rouxi) 
 Little Nepalese horseshoe bat (Rhinolophus subbadius) 
 Trefoil horseshoe bat (Rhinolophus trifoliatus) 
 Dobson's horseshoe bat (Rhinolophus yunanensis)

Family Hipposideridae: leaf-nosed bats 
 East Asian tailless leaf-nosed bat (Coelops frithii) 
 Great roundleaf bat (Hipposideros armiger) 
 Dusky leaf-nosed bat (Hipposideros ater) 
 Ashy roundleaf bat (Hipposideros cineraceus) 
 Khajuria's leaf-nosed bat (Hipposideros durgadasi) 
 Diadem leaf-nosed bat (Hipposideros diadema) 
 Fulvus roundleaf bat (Hipposideros fulvus) 
 Cantor's roundleaf bat (Hipposideros galeritus) 
 Indian roundleaf bat (Hipposideros lankadiva) 
 Intermediate roundleaf bat (Hipposideros larvatus) 
 Pomona roundleaf bat (Hipposideros pomona) 
 Indian roundleaf bat (Hipposideros schistaceus) 
 Schneider's leaf-nosed bat (Hipposideros speoris)

Family Vespertilionidae: evening bats 
 Asian barbastelle (Barbastella leucomelas) 
 Northern bat (Eptesicus nilssoni)  endemic to Kashmir
 Gobi big brown bat (Eptesicus gobiensis) 
 Thick-eared bat (Eptesicus pachyotis) 
 Serotine bat (Eptesicus serotinus) 
 Sombre bat (Eptesicus tatei) 
 Tickell's bat (Hesperoptenus tickelli) 
 Blanford's bat (Hesperoptenus blanfordi) 
 Great evening bat (Ia io) 
 Hairy-faced bat (Myotis annectans) 
 Lesser mouse-eared bat (Myotis blythii) 
 Daubenton's bat (Myotis daubentonii) 
 Hodgson's bat (Myotis formosus) 
 Lesser large-footed bat (Myotis hasseltii) 
 Horsfield's bat (Myotis horsfieldii) 
 Kashmir cave bat (Myotis longipes) 
 Burmese whiskered bat (Myotis montivagus) 
 Wall-roosting mouse-eared bat (Myotis muricola) 
 Whiskered bat (Myotis mystacinus) 
 Peshwa bat (Myotis peshwa) 
 Mandelli's mouse-eared bat (Myotis sicarius) 
 Himalayan whiskered bat (Myotis siligorensis) 
 Lesser noctule (Nyctalus leisleri) 
 Mountain noctule (Nyctalus montanus) 
 Common noctule (Nyctalus noctula) 
 Desert long-eared bat (Otonycteris hemprichii) 
 Dormer's bat (Scotozous dormeri) 
 Chocolate pipistrelle (Pipistrellus affinis) 
 Cadorna's pipistrelle (Pipistrellus cadornae) 
 Kelaart's pipistrelle (Pipistrellus ceylonicus) 
 Indian pipistrelle (Pipistrellus coromandra) 
 Java pipistrelle (Pipistrellus javanicus) 
 Kuhl's pipistrelle (Pipistrellus kuhlii) 
 Mount Popa pipistrelle (Pipistrellus paterculus) 
 Common pipistrelle (Pipistrellus pipistrellus) 
 Savi's pipistrelle (Pipistrellus savii) 
 Least pipistrelle (Pipistrellus tenuis) 
 Brown long-eared bat (Plecotus auritus) 
 Grey long-eared bat (Plecotus austriacus) 
 Desert yellow bat (Scotoecus pallidus) 
 Harlequin bat (Scotomanes ornatus) 
 Greater Asiatic yellow bat (Scotophilus heathii) 
 Lesser Asiatic yellow bat (Scotophilus kuhlii) 
 Lesser bamboo bat (Tylonycteris pachypus) 
 Parti-coloured bat (Vespertilio murinus) 
 Small bent-winged bat (Miniopterus pusillus) 
 Common bent-wing bat (Miniopterus schreibersii) 
 Lesser hairy-winged bat (Harpiocephalus harpia) 
 Round-eared tube-nosed bat (Murina cyclotis) 
 Peters's tube-nosed bat (Murina grisea) 
 Hutton's tube-nosed bat (Murina huttoni) 
 Greater tube-nosed bat (Murina leucogaster) 
 Scully's tube-nosed bat (Murina tubinaris) 
 Little tube-nosed bat (Murina aurata) 
 Hardwicke's woolly bat (Kerivoula hardwickii) 
 Papillose woolly bat (Kerivoula papillosa) 
 Painted bat (Kerivoula picta)

Family Molossidae: free-tailed bats 
 Wroughton's free-tailed bat (Otomops wroughtoni) 
 Egyptian free-tailed bat (Tadarida aegyptiaca) 
 European free-tailed bat (Tadarida teniotis) 
 Wrinkle-lipped free-tailed bat (Chaerephon plicatus)

Order: Primates

Family Lorisidae: lorises
 Bengal slow loris (Nycticebus bengalensis) 
 Gray slender loris (Loris lydekkerianus)

Family Cercopithecidae: Old World monkeys

 Stump-tailed macaque (Macaca arctoides) 
 Assam macaque (Macaca assamensis) 
 Nicobar long-tailed macaque (Macaca fascicularis umbrosa) 
 Rhesus macaque (Macaca mulatta) 
 Arunachal macaque (Macaca munzala) 
 Northern pig-tailed macaque (Macaca leonina) 
 Bonnet macaque (Macaca radiata) 
 Lion-tailed macaque (Macaca silenus) 
 Nepal grey langur (Semnopithecus schistaceus) 
 Tarai grey langur (Semnopithecus hector) 
 Kashmir grey langur (Semnopithecus ajax) 
 Northern plains grey langur (Semnopithecus entellus) 
 Southern plains grey langur (Semnopithecus dussumieri) 
 Black-footed grey langur (Semnopithecus hypoleucos) 
 Tufted grey langur (Semnopithecus priam) 
 Capped langur (Trachypithecus pileatus) 
 Phayre's leaf monkey (Trachypithecus phayrei) 
 Nilgiri langur (Trachypithecus johnii) 
 Gee's golden langur (Trachypithecus geei)

Family Hylobatidae: lesser apes (gibbons)
Earlier classified as a single species, the hoolock gibbon (Hylobates hoolock) has been reclassified as follows:
 Western hoolock gibbon (Hoolock hoolock) 
 Eastern hoolock gibbon (Hoolock leuconedys)

Order: Carnivora: Carnivorans

Family Canidae: canines/dogs 

 Golden jackal (Canis aureus) 
 Indian wolf (Canis lupus pallipes) 
 Dhole (Cuon alpinus) 
 Bengal fox (Vulpes bengalensis) 
 Tibetan fox (Vulpes ferrilata) 
 Red fox (Vulpes vulpes)

Family Felidae: cats 

 Cheetah (Acinonyx jubatus) reintroduction in progress
Southeast African cheetah (A. j. jubatus) introduction in progress
Asiatic cheetah (A. j. venaticus) extirpated
 Caracal (Caracal caracal) 
 Asian golden cat (Catopuma temminckii) 
 Jungle cat (Felis chaus) 
 Asiatic wildcat (Felis lybica ornata) 
 Eurasian lynx (Lynx lynx) 
 Clouded leopard (Neofelis nebulosa) 
 Pallas's cat (Otocolobus manul) 
 Bengal tiger (Panthera tigris tigris) 
 Asiatic lion (Panthera leo leo) 
 Indian leopard (Panthera pardus fusca) 
 Snow leopard (Panthera uncia) 
 Marbled cat (Pardofelis marmorata) 
 Leopard cat (Prionailurus bengalensis) 
 Rusty-spotted cat (Prionailurus rubiginosus) 
 Fishing cat (Prionailurus viverrina)

Family Viverridae: civets and palm civets

 Large Indian civet (Viverra zibetha) 
 Malabar large-spotted civet (Viverra civettina) 
 Small Indian civet (Viverricula indica) 
 Binturong (Arctitis binturong) 
 Asian palm civet (Paradoxurus hermaphroditus) 
 Masked palm civet (Paguma larvata) 
 Brown palm civet (Paradoxurus jerdoni) 
 Small-toothed palm civet (Arctogalidia trivirgata)

Family Prionodontidae: Asiatic linsangs
 Spotted linsang (Prionodon pardicolor)

Family Ursidae: bears 

 Sun bear (Helarctos malayanus) 
 Sloth bear (Melursus ursinus) 
 Himalayan brown bear (Ursus arctos isabellinus) 
 Himalayan black bear (Ursus thibetanus laniger)

Family Ailuropodidae: pandas 
Red panda, A. fulgens

Family Mustelidae: mustelids

Oriental small-clawed otter (Aonyx cinereus) 
Greater hog badger (Arctonyx collaris) 
Northern hog badger (Arctonyx albogularis) 
 Eurasian otter (Lutra lutra) 
 Hairy-nosed otter (Lutra sumatrana)  extirpated
 Smooth-coated otter (Lutrogale perspicillata) 
 Yellow-throated marten (Martes flavigula) 
 Beech marten (Martes foina) 
 Nilgiri marten (Martes gwatkinsii) 
 Honey badger (Mellivora capensis) 
 Chinese ferret badger (Melogale moschata) 
 Burmese ferret badger (Melogale personata) 
Mountain weasel (Mustela altaica) 
 Stoat (Mustela erminea) 
 Steppe polecat (Mustela eversmanii)  presence uncertain
 Yellow-bellied weasel (Mustela kathiah) 
 Siberian weasel (Mustela sibirica) 
 Back-striped weasel (Mustela strigidorsa)

Family Herpestidae: mongooses

Small Indian mongoose, (U. auropunctata) 
 Indian grey mongoose (U. edwardsii) 
 Striped-necked mongoose (U. vitticolla) 
 Crab-eating mongoose (U. urva) 
 Ruddy mongoose (U. smithii) 
 Indian brown mongoose (U. fusca)

Family Hyaenidae: hyenas 

 Striped hyena (Hyaena hyaena)

Order: Cetacea: whales, dolphins, and porpoises

Family Delphinidae
 Short-beaked common dolphin (Delphinus delphis) 
 Short-finned pilot whale (Globicephala macrorhynchus) 
 Risso's dolphin (Grampus griseus) 
 Irrawaddy dolphin (Orcaella brevirostris) 
 Killer whale (Orcinus orca) 
 Melon-headed whale (Peponocephala electra) 
 False killer whale (Pseudorca crassidens) 
 Pygmy killer whale (Feresa attenuata) 
 Indo-Pacific humpback dolphin (Sousa chinensis) 
 Spinner dolphin (Stenella longirostris) 
 Indo-Pacific bottlenose dolphin (Tursiops aduncus) 
 Fraser's dolphin (Lagenodelphis hosei) 
 Pantropical spotted dolphin (Stenella attenuata) 
 Striped dolphin (Stenella coeruleoalba) 
 Rough-toothed dolphin (Steno bredanensis)

Family Platanistidae: river dolphins 
 Ganges river dolphin (Platanista gangetica) 
 Indus river dolphin (Platanista minor)

Family Balaenopteridae 
 Common minke whale (Balaenoptera acutorostrata) 
 Sei whale (Balaenoptera borealis) 
 Bryde's whale (Balaenoptera edeni) 
 Blue whale (Balaenoptera musculus) 
 Fin whale (Balaenoptera physalus) 
 Humpback whale (Megaptera novaeangliae)

Family Balaenidae
 Southern right whale (Eubalaena australis)  evidence unclear

Family Ziphiidae
 Cuvier's beaked whale (Ziphius cavirostris) 
 Blainville's beaked whale (Mesoplodon densirostris) 
 Ginkgo-toothed beaked whale (Mesoplodon ginkgodens)

Family Phocoenidae
 Finless porpoise (Neophocaena phocaenoides)

Family Kogiidae
 Pygmy sperm whale (Kogia breviceps) 
 Dwarf sperm whale (Kogia sima)

Family Physeteridae
 Sperm whale (Physeter macrocephalus)

Order: Sirenia

Family Dugongidae
 Dugong (Dugong dugon)

Order: Proboscidea

Family Elephantidae: elephants
 Indian elephant (Elephas maximus indicus)

Order: Perissodactyla: odd-toed ungulates

Family Equidae: horses 
 Indian wild ass (Equus hemionus khur) 
 Kiang (Equus kiang)

Family Rhinocerotidae: rhinoceroses 
 Sumatran rhinoceros, (Dicerorhinus sumatrensis) extirpated
 Javan rhinoceros, (Rhinoceros sondaicus) extirpated
 Indian rhinoceros (Rhinoceros unicornis)

Order: Artiodactyla: even-toed ungulates

Family Suidae: pigs 
 Pygmy hog (Porcula salvania) 
 Indian boar (Sus scrofa cristatus)

Family Tragulidae: chevrotains
 Indian spotted chevrotain (Moschiola indica)

Family Moschidae
 Alpine musk deer (Moschus chrysogaster) 
 Black musk deer (Moschus fuscus)

Family Cervidae: deer 

 Chital (Axis axis) 
 Indian hog deer (Axis porcinus) 
 Central Asian red deer (Cervus hanglu)  
Kashmir stag (C. h. hanglu) 
 Indian muntjac (Muntiacus muntjak) 
 Leaf muntjac (Muntiacus putaoensis)
 Barasingha (Rucervus duvaucelii) 
 Eld's deer (Rucervus eldii) 
 Sambar deer (Rusa unicolor)

Family Bovidae: bovids 
 Blackbuck (Antilope cervicapra) 
 Gaur (Bos gaurus) 
 Banteng (Bos javanicus)  extirpated
 Wild yak (Bos mutus) 
 Indian aurochs (Bos primigenius namadicus)  extinct
 Nilgai (Boselaphus tragocamelus) 
 Wild water buffalo (Bubalus arnee) 
 Takin (Budorcas taxicolor) 
 Markhor (Capra falconeri) 
 Siberian ibex (Capra sibirica) 
 Mainland serow (Capricornis sumatraensis) 
 Chinkara (Gazella bennettii) 
 Himalayan tahr (Hemitragus jemlahicus) 
 Red goral (Naemorhedus baileyi) 
 Long-tailed goral (Naemorhedus caudatus) 
 Himalayan goral (Naemorhedus goral) 
 Nilgiri tahr (Nilgiritragus hylocrius) 
 Argali (Ovis ammon) 
 Urial (Ovis vignei) 
 Tibetan antelope (Pantholops hodgsoni) 
 Tibetan gazelle (Procapra picticauda) 
 Bharal (Pseudois nayaur) 
 Four-horned antelope (Tetracerus quadricornis)

Order: Pholidota: pangolins

Family Manidae: pangolins 
 Indian pangolin (Manis crassicaudata) 
 Chinese pangolin (Manis pentadactyla)

Order: Rodentia

Family Sciuridae: squirrels
 Hairy-footed flying squirrel (Belomys pearsonii) 
 Namdapha flying squirrel (Biswamoyopterus biswasi) 

Pallas's squirrel (Callosciurus erythraeus) 
 Irrawaddy squirrel (Callosciurus pygerythrus) 
 Orange-bellied Himalayan squirrel (Dremomys lokriah) 
 Perny's long-nosed squirrel (Dremomys pernyi) 
 Asian red-cheeked squirrel (Dremomys rufigenis) 
Western woolly flying squirrel (Eupetaurus cinereus) 
Tibetan woolly flying squirrel (Eupetaurus tibetensis) Jackson, Helgen, Q. Li & Jiang, 2021
 Particolored flying squirrel (Hylopetes alboniger) 
 Afghan flying squirrel (Hylopetes baberi) 
 Kashmir flying squirrel (Hylopetes fimbriatus) 
 Layard's palm squirrel (Funambulus layardi) 
 Indian palm squirrel (Funambulus palmarum) 
 Jungle palm squirrel (Funambulus tristriatus)  endemic
 Northern palm squirrel (Funambulus pennantii) 
 Nilgiri striped squirrel (Funambulus sublineatus) 
 Himalayan marmot (Marmota himalayana) 
 Long-tailed marmot (Marmota caudata) 
Spotted giant flying squirrel (Petaurista elegans) 
 Hodgson's giant flying squirrel (Petaurista magnificus) 
 Bhutan giant flying squirrel (Petaurista nobilis) 
 Red giant flying squirrel (Petaurista petaurista) 
 Indian giant flying squirrel (Petaurista philippensis) 
 Mechuka giant flying squirrel (Petaurista mechukaensis) 
 Mishmi Hills giant flying squirrel (Petaurista mishmiensis) 
 Mebo giant flying squirrel, Petaurista siangensis 
Travancore flying squirrel (Petinomys fuscocapillus) 
 Black giant squirrel (Ratufa bicolor gigantea) 
 Indian giant squirrel or Malabar giant (Ratufa indica) 
 Grizzled giant squirrel (Ratufa macroura) 
 Himalayan striped squirrel (Tamiops mcclellandii)

Family Muridae: Old World rats, mice 
 South China field mouse (Apodemus draco) 
 Sichuan field mouse (Apodemus latronum) 
 Kashmir field mouse (Apodemus rusiges) 
 Wood mouse (Apodemus sylvaticus) 
 Ward's field mouse (Apodemus wardi) 
 Lesser bandicoot rat (Bandicota bengalensis) 
 Greater bandicoot rat (Bandicota indica) 
 Bower's white-toothed rat (Berylmys bowersi) 
 Kenneth's white-toothed rat (Berylmys mackenziei) 
 Manipur white-toothed rat (Berylmys manipulus) 
 Indomalayan pencil-tailed tree mouse (Chiropodomys gliroides) 
 Blanford's rat (Cremnomys blanfordi) 
 Cutch rat (Cremnomys cutchicus) 
 Elvira rat (Cremnomys elvira)  known only from Kurumbapatti, Salem
 Millard's rat (Dacnomys millardi) 
 Crump's mouse (Diomys crumpi) 
 Edwards's long-tailed giant rat (Leopoldamys edwardsi) 
 Sand-colored soft-furred rat (Millardia gleadowi) 
 Kondana soft-furred rat (Millardia kondana) 
 Soft-furred rat or metad (Millardia meltada) 
 Manipur bush rat (Hadromys humei) 
 Little Indian field mouse (Mus booduga) 
 Fawn-colored mouse (Mus cervicolor) 
 Cook's mouse (Mus cookii) 
 Earth-colored mouse (Mus terricolor) 
 Servant mouse (Mus famulus)  endemic to the Western Ghats
 House mouse (Mus musculus) 
 Gairdner's shrewmouse (Mus pahari) 
 Phillips's mouse (Mus phillipsi) 
 Flat-haired mouse (Mus platythrix)  endemic
 Rock-loving mouse (Mus saxicola) 
 Short-tailed bandicoot rat (Nesokia indica) 
 Brahma white-bellied rat (Niviventer brahma) 
 Smoke-bellied rat (Niviventer eha) 
 Chestnut white-bellied rat (Niviventer fulvescens) 
 Lang Bian white-bellied rat (Niviventer langbianis) 
 White-bellied rat (Niviventer niviventer) 
 Tenasserim white-bellied rat (Niviventer tenaster) 
 Nonsense rat (Rattus burrus)  Nicobars
 Polynesian rat (Rattus exulans) 
 Himalayan field rat (Rattus nitidus) 
 Brown rat (Rattus norvegicus) 
 Palm rat (Rattus palmarum) 
 Kerala rat (Rattus ranjiniae)  Western Ghats
 Black rat (Rattus rattus) 
 Sikkim rat (Rattus andamanensis) 
 Andaman rat (Rattus stoicus) 
 Malayan field rat (Rattus tiomanicus) 
 Turkestan rat (Rattus turkestanicus) 
 Asiatic long-tailed climbing mouse (Vandeleuria oleracea) 
 Nilgiri long-tailed tree mouse (Vandeleuria nilagirica) 
 Indian desert jird (Meriones hurrianae) 
 Eurasian harvest mouse (Micromys minutus) 
 Tibetan dwarf hamster (Cricetulus alticola) 
 Grey dwarf hamster (Cricetulus migratorius) 
 Indian gerbil (Tatera indica) 
 Indian hairy-footed gerbil (Gerbillus gleadowi) 
 Balochistan gerbil (Gerbillus nanus) 
 Indian bush rat (Golunda ellioti) 
 Malabar spiny dormouse (Platacanthomys lasiurus) 
 White-tailed mountain vole (Alticola albicauda) 
 Central Kashmir vole (Alticola montosa) 
 Royle's mountain vole (Alticola roylei) 
 Stolička's mountain vole (Alticola stoliczkanus) 
 Silver mountain vole (Alticola argentatus) 
 Père David's vole (Eothenomys melanogaster) 
 Murree vole (Hyperacrius wynnei) 
 Blyth's vole (Microtus leucurus) 
 True's vole (Hyperacrius fertilis) 
 Sikkim mountain vole (Microtus sikimensis) 
 Lesser bamboo rat (Cannomys badius) 
 Hoary bamboo rat (Rhizomys pruinosus)

Family Hystricidae: Old World porcupines 
 Asiatic brush-tailed porcupine (Atherurus macrourus) 
 Malayan porcupine (Hystrix brachyura) 
 Indian crested porcupine (Hystrix indica)

Order: Lagomorpha: hares, rabbits, pikas

Family Leporidae: hares and rabbits
 Hispid hare (Caprolagus hispidus) 
 Cape hare (Lepus capensis) 
 Indian hare (Lepus nigricollis) 
 Woolly hare (Lepus oiostolus) 
 Desert hare (Lepus tibetanus)

Family Ochotonidae: pikas
 Plateau pika (Ochotona curzoniae) 
 Forrest's pika (Ochotona forresti) 
 Ladak pika (Ochotona ladacensis) 
 Large-eared pika (Ochotona macrotis) 
 Nubra pika (Ochotona nubrica) 
 Royle's pika (Ochotona roylei) 
 Moupin pika (Ochotona thibetana)

See also
 Fauna of India
 Lists of mammals by region
 List of mammals of Kerala

References

Other references
 Corbet, G. B. & Hill, J. E. (1992). The Mammals of the Indomalayan Region: A Systematic Review. Oxford University Press.
 Ellerman, J. R. & Morrison-Scott, T. C. S. (1951). Checklist of Palaearctic and Indian Mammals 1758 to 1946. Trustees of the British Museum (Natural History), London
 Prater, S. H. (1971). The Book of Indian Animals. Oxford University Press. (Third edition 1997)
 
 Nameer, P. O. (2000). "Checklist of Indian Mammals". Kerala Forest Department and Kerala Agricultural University. 90+xxv pp.

External links
 A sortable list of all mammals of India and their taxonomic status on Biodiversity of India database. This list is based on data obtained from the Jeev Sampada (IBIN) database. Taxonomy was created based on Catalogue of Life 2010 checklist. 
 Mammals of India CAMP (1998)

 
Mammals
India
 India
India